Euchromius pulverosa is a moth in the family Crambidae. It was described by Hugo Theodor Christoph in 1887. It is found in Azerbaijan, Transcaucasia, Israel, Syria, Iraq, Iran and Kurdistan.

References

Crambinae
Moths described in 1887
Moths of Asia